Lindsay Muir (born 10 May 1956) is a former professional footballer, who played for Hibernian, St Johnstone, Cowdenbeath and Berwick Rangers in the Scottish Football League.

References

External links
 

1956 births
Living people
Scottish footballers
Hibernian F.C. players
St Johnstone F.C. players
Cowdenbeath F.C. players
Berwick Rangers F.C. players
Scottish Football League players
Association football defenders
Scotland under-21 international footballers
Footballers from West Lothian